N.O. Hits at All are a series of compilation albums by American musician Nick Oliveri, released through Heavy Psych Sounds Records. The tracks used on these albums are from bands Oliveri has provided vocals for either as a member or a guest.

Background 
In November 2016, Oliveri announced the release of a series of compilation albums titled, N.O. Hits at All, to be issued on Heavy Psych Sounds Records. As of 2022, seven volumes have been released.

Track listings

N.O. Hits at All Vol.1 

N.O. Hits at All Vol.1 was released on January 27, 2017.

Notes
"Anything and Everything" is an acoustic version of the song "Anything That Moves", which appears on Vol.5.

N.O. Hits at All Vol.2 

N.O. Hits at All Vol.2 was released on July 7, 2017.

Notes
"Green Machine" is an acoustic version of the Kyuss song of the same name from the album Blues for the Red Sun.
"Back to Dungaree High" is taken from the Turbonegro tribute album Alpha Motherfuckers.

N.O. Hits at All Vol.3 

N.O. Hits at All Vol.3 was released on October 20, 2017.

Notes

 "Luv Is Fiction" is one of three separate recordings/reworkings of the song. The second version being featured in the Dwarves album The Dwarves Invented Rock & Roll, and the third in Leave Me Alone.
 "Kyuss Dies!" is listed as being performed by Kyuss Lives!, despite the band having changed its name to Vista Chino. This indicates that the song may have been recorded while the band was still operating under the former moniker. The song was later rerecorded for the Mondo Generator album, Fuck It.

N.O. Hits at All Vol.4 

N.O. Hits at All Vol.4 was released on February 23, 2018.

Notes

 "Walk On" is a reworking of "Come and You're Gone" from Oliveri's solo album, Leave Me Alone.
 "Super Hero" features Oliveri on vocals rather than Blag Dahlia on the original version from the HeWhoCannotBeNamed album Love.

N.O. Hits at All Vol.5 

N.O. Hits at All Vol.5 was released on October 12, 2018.

Notes

 "It's You I Don't Believe" and "Anything That Moves" are two songs taken from the Dwarves' album Take Back the Night. The former song was rerecorded for Mondo Generator's Fuck It.
 "Anything and Everything" from Vol.1 and "Anything That Moves" are the same song, aside from the former being an acoustic version and the latter being a studio version with the Dwarves.
 The artwork for Vol.5 contains ball-peen hammers with blood on them. This is most likely a reference to the Roky Erickson song "Bloody Hammer", upon which Oliveri recorded a cover version for with Queens of the Stone Age and Mondo Generator.
 "Campfire Kyuss" consists of acoustic versions of various Kyuss songs, including "Gardenia" from Welcome to Sky Valley, and "The Law", "Big Bikes" and "I'm Not",  all from Wretch.
 "976 Whore" is a reworking of "Night Calls" from the Mondo Generator album Hell Comes to Your Heart. A rerecorded shorter version of the song later appeared on Mondo Generator's Shooters Bible.
 "Won't Let Me Go" is an acoustic version of "Won't Let Go", also from Hell Comes to Your Heart. The latter was later rerecorded and appeared on Shooters Bible.

N.O. Hits at All Vol.666 
N.O. Hits All Vol.666 was released on March 6, 2020.

Notes
 Two separate track listings of this album exist, with the songs "The Cure" and "S.V.E.T.L.A.N.A.S." being replaced on the other version by "Lovely Bong" by The Young Tuffs, and "Auto 2000 Demo Session 2000" by Stöner, respectively.
 "Fuck 'Em All" is a reworking of the song of the same name from the Dwarves album, Thank Heaven for Little Girls, and features Oliveri on vocals instead of Blag Dahlia.
 "Bite It You Scum" is an acoustic cover of the song of the same name by GG Allin.
 "In Pieces" is a reworking of the song "Like a Bomb" from the Mondo Generator album, Dead Planet.

N.O. Hits at All Vol.7 
N.O. Hits at All Vol.7 was released on July 2, 2021.

Notes
"Bram Stalker" was originally titled "Dormant" for its single release by Bram Stalker.
"Disease with No Control" is a rerecording of the version that appeared on Mondo Generator's Fuck It.

References 

Compilation albums by American artists
Compilation album series